Lenka Pospíšilová-Černá (born 13 May 1966) is a former Czechoslovak female handball player. She was a member of the Czechoslovakia women's national handball team. She was part of the  team at the 1988 Summer Olympics. On club level she played for Zora Olomouc in Olomouc.

References

External links 
 Lenka Černá on Eurohandball.com 

1966 births
Living people
Czechoslovak female handball players
Handball players at the 1988 Summer Olympics
Olympic handball players of Czechoslovakia
Sportspeople from Olomouc